Brownback is a surname. Notable people with the surname include:

Sam Brownback (born 1956), American politician, attorney, and diplomat
Peter Brownback, American military officer and lawyer